Calosoma cyanescens is a species of ground beetle in the subfamily of Carabinae. It was described by Victor Motschulsky in 1859.

References

cyanescens
Beetles described in 1859